McGimpsey is a surname. Notable people with the surname include:

David McGimpsey, Canadian poet and author
Garth McGimpsey (born 1955), Northern Ireland amateur golfer
Michael McGimpsey (born 1948), Northern Ireland politician